Water polo at the 2010 South American Games in Medellín was held from March 20 to March 25. All games were played at Piscina Olímpica Horacio Martínez de Copacabana.

Medal summary

Medal table

Men

First round

5th/6th Placement

Semifinals

Bronze-medal match

Gold-medal match

Women

First round

Semifinals

Bronze-medal match

Gold-medal match

References

2010 South American Games
Qualification tournaments for the 2011 Pan American Games
2010
2010 in water polo
2010